The 1990 Philippine Basketball Association (PBA) All-Filipino Conference was the second conference of the 1990 PBA season. It started on June 10 and ended on September 4, 1990. The tournament is an All-Filipino format, which doesn't require an import or a pure-foreign player for each team.

Format
The following format will be observed for the duration of the conference:
The teams were divided into 2 groups.

Group A:
Formula Shell Zoom Masters
Pepsi Hotshots
Presto Tivolis
San Miguel Beermen

Group B:
Alaska Air Force
Añejo Rum 65ers
Purefoods Hotdogs
Pop Cola Sizzlers

Teams in a group will play against each other twice and against teams in the other group once; 10 games per team; Teams are then seeded by basis on win–loss records. Ties are broken among point differentials of the tied teams. Standings will be determined in one league table; teams do not qualify by basis of groupings.
The top five teams after the eliminations will advance to the semifinals.
Semifinals will be two round robin affairs with the remaining five teams. Results from the eliminations will be carried over. A playoff incentive for a finals berth will be given to the team that will win at least five of their eight semifinal games.
The top two teams (or the top team and the winner of the playoff incentive) will face each other in a best-of-seven championship series. The next two teams (or the loser of the playoff incentive and the fourth seeded team) dispute the third-place trophy in a best of five playoff.

Elimination round

Team standings

Semifinals

Team standings

Cumulative standings

Semifinal round standings:

Finals berth incentive playoff

Finals berth playoff

Third place playoffs

Finals

References

External links
 PBA.ph

PBA Philippine Cup
All-Filipino Conference